In enzymology, a sphingosine cholinephosphotransferase is an enzyme that catalyzes the chemical reaction

CDP-choline + sphingosine  CMP + sphingosyl-phosphocholine

Thus, the two substrates of this enzyme are CDP-choline and sphingosine, whereas its two products are CMP and sphingosyl-phosphocholine.

This enzyme belongs to the family of transferases, specifically those transferring non-standard substituted phosphate groups.  The systematic name of this enzyme class is CDP-choline:sphingosine cholinephosphotransferase. Other names in common use include CDP-choline-sphingosine cholinephosphotransferase, phosphorylcholine-sphingosine transferase, cytidine diphosphocholine-sphingosine cholinephosphotransferase, and sphingosine choline phosphotransferase.  This enzyme participates in sphingolipid metabolism.

References

 

EC 2.7.8
Enzymes of unknown structure